Wadicourt is a village in the Somme department in Hauts-de-France in northern France, located south of Calais. It is part of the commune of Dompierre-sur-Authie. The Battle of Crécy was fought on a ridge between Wadicourt and Crécy-en-Ponthieu in 1346.

Citations

References

External links
Wadicourt on the 1750 Cassini Map

Villages in Hauts-de-France
History of Somme (department)